Jan Stachniuk (13 January 1905 - 14 August 1963) was a Polish philosopher, an editor-in-chief of the Polish pre-war nationalist journal Zadruga, the creator of the Zadruga Movement, a theoretician and the founder of culturalism.

Jan Stachniuk was born on 13 January 1905 in Kovel. In 1930 he finished his education at the College of Commerce in Poznań. During World War II, he fought in the ranks of the Home Army.

Publications
 Kolektywizm a naród (Collectivism and the nation), 1933
 Heroiczna wspólnota narodu (Heroic community of nation), 1935
 Państwo a gospodarstwo (State and the economy), 1939
 Dzieje bez dziejów (History without history), 1939
 Mit słowiański (Slavic myth), 2006; written in 1941
 Zagadnienie totalizmu (The question of totalitarianism),1943
 Człowieczeństwo i kultura (Humanity and culture),1946
 Walka o zasady (Fight for principles),1947
 Wspakultura (Back-culture),1948
 Droga rewolucji kulturowej w Polsce (The path of cultural revolution in Poland), 2006; written in 1948
 Chrześcijaństwo a ludzkość (Christianity and humanity), 1997; written in 1949

See also 
 Julius Evola
 Franco Freda
 Feliks Koneczny 
 Stanisław Szukalski

References

Footnotes

Sources
 

1905 births
1963 deaths
Burials at Powązki Military Cemetery
20th-century Polish philosophers
Home Army members
Warsaw Uprising insurgents
People from Kovel
Recipients of the Cross of Valour (Poland)
Polish modern pagans
Modern pagan philosophers
Founders of modern pagan movements